Patrikeya (born 15 August 1971 as Manikeswaram Bhaskara Rao) is a journalist and screenwriter in Telugu Cinema. Patrikeya introduced as a screenwriter for Telugu movie Krishna Vamsi's Paisa.

Early life and education

Patrikeya was born in Chirala, Andhra Pradesh. Patrikeya completed post graduation in Potti Sriramulu Telugu University Hyderabad.

Career
Patrikeya works as film journalist in Telugu newspapers. His screenwriter career started with Krishna Vamsi's Telugu movie Paisa.

Writer

References

External links
 

Living people
Indian male screenwriters
Telugu screenwriters
1971 births